The Kansas City Live Stock Exchange was the headquarters of the Kansas City Stockyards. It is located at 1600 Gennesse in Kansas City, Missouri, in the West Bottoms. The building is listed on the National Register of Historic Places.
It is owned by Bill Haw.

Architecture
The building, which began construction in 1909 and was completed in 1911, was the largest livestock exchange building in the world.  In 1957, a one-story addition was constructed on the south side of the building for the Golden Ox restaurant which had opened in the building in 1949.

The building has been renovated and currently serves as an office building with numerous business and personal services, including but not limited to, a coffee shop that also serves breakfast and lunch, barber/stylist, a health club including a masseuse, and a U.S. Post Office (the post office closed as of December 2008.)

References

External links
National Registry entry
Kansas City Public Library history
Livestock Exchange Building Commercial Website

Economy of Kansas City, Missouri
Buildings and structures in Kansas City, Missouri
Headquarters in the United States
Commercial buildings on the National Register of Historic Places in Missouri
National Register of Historic Places in Kansas City, Missouri